The Madhyamakāvatāra is a text by Candrakīrti (600–c. 650) on the Mādhyamaka school of Buddhist philosophy. Candrakīrti also wrote an auto-commentary to the work, called the Madhyamakāvatārabhasya.

It is traditionally considered as a commentary on the meaning of Nagarjuna's Mūlamadhyamakakārikā and the Ten Stages Sutra (Daśabhūmika Sūtra). As such, within the Tibetan Buddhist canon this text is classified as commentarial literature.

The text
The Madhyamakāvatāra relates the Mādhyamaka doctrine of śūnyatā to the "spiritual discipline" (Sanskrit: sādhanā) of a bodhisattva. The Madhyamakāvatāra contains eleven chapters, where each addresses one of the ten pāramitās or "perfections" fulfilled by bodhisattvas as they traverse the 'ten stages' (Sanskrit: bhūmi) to buddhahood, which is the final chapter.

Commentarial literature

The Madhyamakāvatārabhasya is Candrakīrti's own auto-commentary to the text.
The Madhyamakāvatāraṭīkā is an elaborate 11th century commentary by the Indian scholar Jayānanda.
Jamgon Ju Mipham Gyatso (1846–1912) wrote a commentary on the Madhyamakavatara entitled: dbu ma la 'jug pa'i 'grel pa zla ba'i zhal lung dri me shel phreng; the title has been rendered into English by Duckworth (2008: p. 232) as: Immaculate Crystal Rosary and by Padmakara Translations in  it is titled The Word of Chandra: The Necklace of Spotless Crystal 

Khenpo Shenga, dbu ma la 'jug pa'i 'grel mchan legs par bshad pa zla ba'i 'od zer
Khenpo Ngawang Palzang, dbu ma 'jug pa'i 'bru 'grel blo gsal dga' ba'i me long 
Jeffrey Hopkins (1980). Compassion in Tibetan Buddhism. Ithaca: Snow Lion. (first five chapters based on Tsongkhapa’s commentary)
Rendawa Shonnu Lodro (1997). Commentary on the Entry into the Middle, Lamp which Elucidates Reality, translated by Stotter-Tillman & Acharya Tashi Tsering, Sarnath, Varanasi.

English translations
Fredrik Liland (trans) (2020). Madhyamakāvatāra (Bibliotheca Polyglotta) with Madhyamakāvatārabhasya and translations from Jayānanda's commentary.
Geshe Rabten (translator, commentator) Stephen Batchelor (translator, editor) (1983). Echoes of Voidness, London : Wisdom Publications
Huntington, C. W. (1989). The Emptiness of Emptiness. University of Hawaii Press
Geshe Kelsang Gyatso. Ocean of Nectar: Wisdom and Compassion in Mahayana Buddhism. London: Tharpa Publications, 1995.
Padmakara Translation Group (2002). Introduction to the Middle Way (Candrakirti's Madhyamakāvatāra with Mipham Rinpoche's Commentary). Shambhala
Introduction to the Middle Way: Chandrakirti's Madhyamakavatara with commentary by Dzongsar Jamyang Khyentse Rinpoche, edited by Alex Trisoglio, Khyentse Foundation, 2003
A translation of the Madhyamakavatara and its Auto-Commentary by Chandrakirti with additional commentary by Khenpo Namdrol Rinpoche

See also
Je Tsongkhapa
Istituto Lama Tzong Khapa

References

Further reading
Huntington, C. W.(1983). "The system of the two truths in the Prasannapadā and The Madhyamakāvatāra: A study in Mādhyamika soteriology." Journal of Indian Philosophy 11 (1): pp: 77-106.

Madhyamaka
Mahayana texts
Buddhist philosophy
Tibetan Buddhist texts
Buddhist commentaries